Hung Shih-Ting, often credited as "Shih-Ting Hung", is a film director, whose first feature film is in pre-production development as of 2022.

Her film, VIOLA : the Traveling Rooms of a Little Giant, earned her a Student Academy Award from Academy of Motion Picture Arts and Sciences in 2008. The film is now in permanent collection at the Academy Archive at AMPAS, Hollywood. Hung Shih-Ting now works globally as a commercial and music video director, she joined Ridley Scott Associates (RSA Films Asia) in 2009, while maintaining freelance status in most parts of the world.

Early life
Hung Shih-Ting was born in Taipei, Taiwan and raised on an archipelago called Penghu. As a young child, she started painting at age four and piano lessons at five. Her first name "Shih" (pronounced as "she") means "poetry", while her surname "Hung", one of the 15th-most-common surname in Mandarin, means "flood",  

As a teenager on an island of only 70,000 population, Hung Shih-Ting went through lonely school years and developed the love for Hollywood movies at the age of twelve. She regarded cinema as "a life saving, time space travel device" that worked wonder to her mind. Fantasy genre, above all, was her favorite. From one interview in 2020, Hung Shih-Ting spoke about recording audio from movie Jerry Maguire on TV to cassette tapes and listening to them hundreds of times repeatedly to practice English,  

In 1999, Hung Shih-Ting then left hometown Penghu at age nineteen to Taipei, pursuing her Bachelor of Fine Arts degree at National Taiwan Normal University, which was considered the best fine art school at that time nationally. Influenced by her classmates and fellow musician friends, she then ventured out to independent music and world cinema,

Career
Soon followed was her Hollywood dream, when she studied her Master of Fine Arts degree at the School of Cinema, University of Southern California in Los Angeles, USA. Majored in Animation, her thesis film, VIOLA : the Traveling Rooms of a Little Giant (2008), received a Student Academy Award in the Alternative Category and as well as the cover of the Academy Report. She was the first student in history at the USC Animation Department to receive such honor. The original print of the film is now at the Academy Archive at AMPAS, Hollywood.

Having experienced the landscape of the 2009 economic crisis as well as the ever present challenges of gender and race issues in the industry, Hung Shih-Ting has overcome much adversity to achieve professional success at an international level as a commercial director. By persistently knocking on doors and not taking no for an answer, she continues to build her impressive repertoire and filmmaking skills by leading productions in different countries with diverse culture. In 2019, Hung Shih-Ting went to Greece to shoot a short film about refugees, and also helming the regional productions (Greece/Germany) for the music video of the 2020 Tokyo Olympics theme song, 

Hung Shih-Ting has also developed stronger voices to advocate for women’s rights. She has been speaking at United Nations NGO CSW 66 Forum, University of Southern California Symposium, Berlin Commercial Festival for Diversity Panel, and Shanghai International Film Festival, as well as many schools, colleges, and organizations.

Films 
 Franz (Post Production)(2022)
 VIOLA:The Traveling Rooms of a Little Giant (2008)

Exhibitions 
 2018 | Taipei Art District Festival (video installation)
 2015 | Portrait of Brains : Shih-Ting Hung solo exhibition at Taipei Digital Art Center
 2013 | Digital Print : The Face at Taipei Digital Art Center ( June 25 - Aug 25th, 2013) 
 2013 | Teresa Teng Exhibition, in memory of the legendary Chinese cultural icon, showcase Jan to April, 2013 on a 160inch x 40inch screen at Chiang Kai-shek Memorial Hall, Taiwan, Shanghai, and six major cities in Asia.
 2010 | Museum of Contemporary Art Taipei [TAIPEI MOCA] (2009) : VIOLA:The Traveling Rooms of a Little Giant (2008) | Taipei Digital Award (video installation)
 2010 | Singapore Art Museum (2010) : VIOLA:The Traveling Rooms of a Little Giant (2008) (video installation)
 2010 | "YouTube Play" : collaboration between Solomon R. Guggenheim Museum & YouTube to showcase 125 video artists' works selected from more than 23,000 submissions in 91 countries.

Awards 
35th Student Academy Awards - "Gold Medal in Alternative category" / USA
Kustendorf Film Festival - "Bronze Award" / Serbia
Taipei Digital Art Award - nomination / Taiwan
Fotokem Award - Bronze Award / USA
Moondance Film Festival - Multi-Media Film - Spirit Award / USA
5th Singapore short Film Festival - "Voice Award" / Singapore
2008 Sidewalk Moving Picture Festival - Best Student Film / USA

Music videos

Other credits 
 United Airline: Heart (USA) (compositor) - Annie Award winner (2008) 
The Willowz: Jubilee (stop motion animator) (2008) 
 Honda Element [(Partizan)] (2D animator) (2008)
 Norah Jones: Sinkin' Soon (Partizan) (2D animator) (2007)

References

External links 
 
 

Living people
1980 births
Taiwanese film directors